Frangella is a surname. Notable people with the surname include:

Andrew Frangella (born 1977), American dentist
Barbara Frangella (born 1996), Argentine volleyball player
Luis Frangella (1944–1990), Argentine painter and sculptor